Alan Storkey (born 2 October 1943, in London) is an economist, sociologist and artist. He is known for his writing and lectures and for his work on transport and the arms trade. He grew up in Wembley, Nottingham and Norwich, the son of Alec and Doris Storkey. 

In 1968 he married Elaine Storkey née Elaine Lively, a philosopher, sociologist and broadcaster. They have three sons, five grandsons and a granddaughter.

Education and academic posts
Alan Storkey was educated at the City of Norwich School, where he was school captain, and then at Christ's College, Cambridge where he studied economics. He did postgraduate work in sociology at the London School of Economics and a doctorate in economics (consumption theory) at the Vrije Universiteit, Amsterdam, studying under Bob Goudzwaard. His first academic post was in sociology at Stirling University from where he went on to direct the Shaftesbury Project. Having taught economics and politics at Worksop College, he became a member of the Research Scholars in Economics team at Calvin College, Grand Rapids, Michigan, United States, in the early 1980s. He was Director of Studies for 20 years at Oak Hill Theological College, London, until 2003, responsible for the academic programme with Middlesex University.

Publications
Storkey is a writer with a number of published works. These include:
A Christian Social Perspective in 1979
Transforming Economics
The Meanings of Love,
Epistemological Foundations in Consumption Theory
Marriage and its Modern Crisis
Jesus and Politics: Confronting the Powers
Beneath the Surface of the Kosovo War: Arms Trade and the Peace of Nations
War or Peace: The long failure of Western arms

He has contributed to many published symposia and columns in national newspapers and writes a regular column for the Church Times and the Church of England Newspaper.

Marriage and its Modern Crisis was written in response to a working party report from the Church of England. His book Jesus and Politics was featured at the Jubilee Conference in Pittsburgh, PA.

In the 1990s Storkey was chair of the Movement for Christian Democracy and in 1997 unsuccessfully contested the parliamentary seat of Enfield Southgate when Michael Portillo lost his seat to Stephen Twigg, (styled by the media as the 'Portillo moment').

He has given submissions to Government Enquiries into Transport on a motorway-based coach system and has been a member of a campaigning group on greener transport. His work on transport is referenced in George Monbiot's book, Heat.

Art work

Storkey is also an artist and paints both landscapes and portraits. He exhibits regularly and five of his paintings, especially "Early Mist Over Granchester", are featured on the official Grantchester website.

References

External links
 
 Submission by Alan Storkey to Select Committee on Transport Memoranda, regarding the Transport Committee Inquiry into Bus Services across the UK (2006)
 "The surrogate sciences", essay by Alan Storkey

English economists
1943 births
Living people
Vrije Universiteit Amsterdam alumni
Alumni of the London School of Economics
Alumni of Christ's College, Cambridge